Governor Bradley may refer to:

Lewis R. Bradley (1805–1879), 2nd Governor of Nevada
Michael J. Bradley (colonial administrator) (1933–2010), Governor of the Turks and Caicos from 1987 to 1993
William O'Connell Bradley (1847–1914), 32nd Governor of Kentucky
Willis W. Bradley (1884–1954), Governor of Guam